Jiří Jantovsky (born July 18, 1975) is a Czech former professional ice hockey right winger.

Jantovsky played 335 games in the Czech Extraliga, playing for HC Pardubice, HC Slavia Praha, HC Vsetín, HC Znojemští Orli, HC Karlovy Vary, HC Sparta Praha and HC Dukla Jihlava. He also played in Norway's GET-ligaen for Bergen IK, IK Comet and Sparta Sarpsborg.

References

External links

1975 births
Living people
IK Comet players
Czech expatriate sportspeople in Norway
Czech ice hockey right wingers
HC Dukla Jihlava players
HC Dynamo Pardubice players
HC Karlovy Vary players
Orli Znojmo players
HC Slavia Praha players
HC Sparta Praha players
Sparta Warriors players
HC Tábor players
Tønsberg Vikings players
VHK Vsetín players
Czech expatriate ice hockey people
Expatriate ice hockey players in Norway